The Tusket Islands are a chain of islands located in the Atlantic Ocean off the coast of Nova Scotia, south of the town Yarmouth.

History
In 1633, Jean de Laite referred to the islands as "Isles aux Tangneux" in his work The New World. The Mi'kmaq referred to the islands as "Aglassawakade," or "place of the English."

There is a local belief that pirate treasure is hidden on one of the islands.

Several dwellings were built on the islands during early decades of European settlement.

Geography
The islands stretch along the coast from Pinkney's Point to Wedgeport. Big Tusket Island has the highest elevation at 31 metres and Bald Tusket Island has an elevation of 16 metres.

The islands include:

 Allen Island
 Pease Island
 Spectacle Island
 Ellenwood Island
 Murder Island (also known as Île du Massacre) - Local lore attributes the numerous human remains found on the island to the extermination of slaves brought up from the Caribbean or Africa subsequent to their work in the construction of subterranean architecture relating to the Oak Island treasure mystery. 
 Harris Island
 Holmes Island
 Haymaker Island
 Turpentine Island
 Owls Head Island
 Eagle Island
 Marks Island
 Candlebox Island
 Tarpaulin Island
 Dog Island
 Calf Island
 Big Tusket Island (also known as St. Martin's Island)
 Green Island
 Inner Bald Tusket Island
 Outer Bald Tusket Island - Location of the micronation Principality of Outer Baldonia.

References

Communities in Yarmouth County
Islands of Nova Scotia
General Service Areas in Nova Scotia
Landforms of Yarmouth County
Archipelagoes of Canada